Ryus is an unincorporated community in Grant County, Kansas, United States.  It lies in northeastern Sullivan Township at the intersection of the Cimarron Valley Railroad with K-190, 14 miles (22 km) southeast of the county seat of Ulysses.

See also
 Santa Fe Trail

References

Further reading

External links
 Grant County maps: Current, Historic, KDOT

Unincorporated communities in Grant County, Kansas
Unincorporated communities in Kansas